Memory latency is the time (the latency) between initiating a request for a byte or word in memory until it is retrieved by a processor. If the data are not in the processor's cache, it takes longer to obtain them, as the processor will have to communicate with the external memory cells. Latency is therefore a fundamental measure of the speed of memory: the less the latency, the faster the reading operation.

Latency should not be confused with memory bandwidth, which measures the throughput of memory. Latency can be expressed in clock cycles or in time measured in nanoseconds. Over time, memory latencies expressed in clock cycles have been fairly stable, but they have improved in time.

See also
 Burst mode (computing)
 CAS latency
 Multi-channel memory architecture
 Interleaved memory
 SDRAM burst ordering
 SDRAM latency

References

External links 
 Overview of the different kinds of Memory Latency
 Article and Analogy of the Effects of Memory Latency

Computer memory

ar:كمون ذاكرة
el:Λανθάνων χρόνος προσπέλασης μνήμης
he:זמן אחזור
hu:Memóriakésleltetés
ru:Тайминги